Fahim Saleh (December 12, 1986 – July 13, 2020) was a Bangladeshi-American entrepreneur and computer programmer who founded Gokada in Nigeria, Pathao and JoBike. Saleh was also a founding partner of Adventure Capital, a Manhattan-based venture capital firm.

Biography 
Saleh was born in Saudi Arabia, to Bangladeshi parents who frequently relocated for work, before settling in Rochester, New York. He taught himself to program at a young age, and created a variety of online projects such as a website for his family, a teenage social platform and a prank dial service, PrankDial, after his graduation from Bentley University. When he had grown older, Saleh said that he wanted to create something that "adds legitimate value to humanity". He created his first company while still in high school. He used income from PrankDial to fund his further ventures. PrankDial was somewhat controversial because it was abused as a tool for harassment.

He went on to co-found the ride company Pathao, which was popular in Bangladesh and Nepal, in 2015. The company was valued at $100 million. In 2018, Saleh also helped found Nigerian Gokada, a Nigerian ride-hail startup for motorbike taxis, that had millions of dollars in funding and gained a lot of traction in the country. The company faced a setback after authorities in Lagos banned motorbike taxis in 2020. Fahim also invested in another ride-sharing company named Picap in Colombia.

Friends called Saleh the "Elon Musk of the developing world". Complex estimated his net worth to be $150 million.

Death 
On July 14, 2020, Saleh was found dead in his luxury apartment on the Lower East Side of Manhattan. Police have said that he was killed the day before.

On the night of July 13, neighbors heard yelling from Saleh's unit and contacted his sister. After her attempts to contact him failed, she visited his condo on July 14 and found a grisly scene. She called police, who found Saleh's torso next to an electric saw, and his head and limbs in garbage bags elsewhere in the apartment. An autopsy report from the Chief Medical Examiner concluded that Saleh died from multiple stab wounds. Detectives have classified this case as a homicide. A police source told The New York Times that Saleh was followed by a man dressed in black into the key-secured elevator that led to his apartment on the seventh floor. Security footage depicted Saleh struggling out of the elevator and onto his apartment floor. Detectives suspect that the killer fled the scene through the backdoor after Saleh's sister arrived looking for him, according to another police source.

On July 17, Saleh's personal assistant, 21-year-old Tyrese Devon Haspil, was arrested and charged with murder, since Haspil had been the prime suspect of murder with incriminating surveillance videos that show him using the tech CEO's credit card after the murder and buying cleaning supplies, electric saw at Home Depot. However Haspil has pleaded not guilty. The case against Haspil was adjourned until January 11, 2021.

Reactions 
His death caused shock and sympathy from the tech community. Pathao and Gokada praised him after his death; Gokada called him "A great leader, inspiration and positive light for all of us" in its tweet.

References 

1986 births
2020 deaths
21st-century American businesspeople
American Internet company founders
American computer programmers
American technology executives
American people of Bangladeshi descent
Bangladeshi emigrants to the United States
Businesspeople from New York City
Businesspeople from Rochester, New York
Deaths by stabbing in New York (state)
People from the Lower East Side
Bentley University alumni